Chellamalla Suguna Kumari, M.D. (born 25 July 1955) is an Indian parliamentarian from Hyderabad, Telangana.

Personal life
Chellamalla was born in Hyderabad, Andhra Pradesh in 1955. Her father is C. Pochaiah. She successfully completed her M.B., B.S., M.D., D.G.O. and D. Ch. at Osmania Medical College and practises medicine. She is also involved in social work.

She married Dr. M. Rajendra Prasad in 1981. They have two sons.

Political career
Kumari was elected to the 12th Lok Sabha from Peddapalli (Lok Sabha constituency) in 1998 as a member of Telugu Desam Party. She was elected for the second term from the same constituency to 13th Lok Sabha in 2004.

She has been a member of various Parliamentary committees on Petroleum and Chemicals, on Government Assurances and Ministry of Health and Family Welfare.

References

1955 births
India MPs 1998–1999
Women in Telangana politics
Telangana politicians
Politicians from Hyderabad, India
Telugu politicians
Living people
Telugu Desam Party politicians
India MPs 1999–2004
Lok Sabha members from Andhra Pradesh
20th-century Indian women politicians
20th-century Indian politicians
21st-century Indian women politicians
21st-century Indian politicians
People from Karimnagar district